Chasŏng station is a railway station in Chasŏng-ŭp, Chasŏng County, Chagang Province, North Korea, on the Pukbunaeryuk Line of the Korean State Railway.

History

The station was opened on 27 November 1987 by the Korean State Railway, along with the rest of the first western section of the Pukpu Line between Unbong (Sinunbong) and Chasŏng.

References

Railway stations in North Korea